Since 1959, the Mid-Hudson Library System (MHLS) has acted to ensure the public's right to free access, facilitate economical resource sharing, and promote professional library services while working in partnerships with the independent public and free association libraries in New York's Hudson Valley.

MHLS comprises libraries in five counties: Columbia County, Dutchess County, Greene County, Putnam County and Ulster County. The System's headquarters is in the city of Poughkeepsie.

Member libraries

Columbia County

Dutchess County

Greene County

Putnam County

Ulster County

References

External links
 
 Library Catalog
 Weekly Bulletin

County library systems in New York (state)
Education in Columbia County, New York
Education in Dutchess County, New York
Education in Greene County, New York
Education in Putnam County, New York
Education in Ulster County, New York
Education in Poughkeepsie, New York
Education in the Hudson Valley
Public libraries in New York (state)